Efemia Chela (born 1991) is a Zambian-Ghanaian writer, literary critic, and editor. "Chicken", her first published story, was shortlisted for the 2014 Caine Prize for African Writing. Chela has had short stories and poems published in New Internationalist, Wasafiri, Token  and Pen Passages: Africa. In 2016, she co-edited the Short Story Day Africa collection, Migrations. She was also the Andrew W. Mellon Writer-in-Residence at Rhodes University in 2018. She is currently the Francophone and Contributing editor for The Johannesburg Review of Books.

Born in Zambia, Chela grew up in England, Ghana, Botswana and South Africa.  She graduated with a BA degree in French, Politics, and Classical civilizations from Rhodes University in South Africa, and at the Institut D’Etudes Politiques in Aix-en-Provence, France.

References

1991 births
Living people
Zambian short story writers
Zambian poets
Zambian women poets
Zambian women short story writers
Ghanaian women short story writers
Ghanaian short story writers
Ghanaian women poets
21st-century Ghanaian poets
Rhodes University alumni
21st-century short story writers
21st-century Ghanaian women writers
21st-century Zambian women writers